Raquel Atawo and Anna-Lena Grönefeld were the defending champions, but chose not to participate together this year. Atawo played alongside Katarina Srebotnik, but lost in the quarterfinals to Anastasia Pavlyuchenkova and Lucie Šafářová. Grönefeld teamed up with Demi Schuurs, but lost in the first round to Gabriela Dabrowski and Jeļena Ostapenko.

Mona Barthel and Anna-Lena Friedsam won the title, defeating Pavlyuchenkova and Šafářová in the final, 2–6, 6–3, [10–6].

Seeds

Draw

Draw

References

 Main Draw

Porsche Tennis Grand Prixandnbsp;- Doubles
2019 Doubles